Kurt Wagner may refer to:
Kurt Wagner (actor) (born 1953), German actor
Kurt Wagner (general) (1904–1989), German general and politician
Kurt Wagner (musician) (born 1958), American musician
Kurt Wagner (comics) or Nightcrawler, a Marvel comic book superhero